Pettman is a surname. Notable people with the surname include:

Professor Barrie Pettman, Baron of Bombie (born 1944), British author, publisher and philanthropist.
Dominic Pettman, cultural theorist and writer
Edgar Pettman (1866–1943), English organist, choral conductor and music editor
Stuart Pettman (born 1975), English snooker player